Jake Chapman (born 1984) was an Iowa State Senator from the 10th District. A Republican, he served in the Iowa Senate after being elected in 2012 to a seat that had no incumbent due to redistricting. At the age of 28, Chapman won the election and served as the youngest State Senator in the 85th General Assembly.

Personal life 

Born in Adel, Iowa, Chapman attended the now defunct AIB College of Business, where he earned a bachelor's degree in business administration.

He is an Eagle Scout.

He currently resides in Adel He directs the operations of his family business as the Chief Operating Officer.

Iowa Senate

On January 16, 2020, Chapman, through a Senate subcommittee, advanced an amendment saying that the Iowa Constitution does not protect abortion rights. Opponents say it would harm women. Subcommittee member, Senator Claire Celsi stated, "This proposed constitutional amendment would put Iowa women’s lives at risk and infringe on their freedom and fundamental rights," she said. "I know the real plan here is to ban safe and legal abortion in Iowa, and I’m opposed to it."

Chapman opposes gun legislation that would allow authorities to temporarily take firearms from someone deemed to be a danger to themselves or others.

During a school board meeting in Johnston, Iowa, on November 18, 2021 Chapman stated that "he would be asking for every single teacher who disseminated that information to be held criminally responsible," referring to books in school libraries.

During opening remarks in the Iowa Senate on January 10, 2022, Senate President Chapman stated that educators and the media had a "sinister agenda."

As of January 2022, Chapman served on the following committees:  Commerce and Rules and Administration as well as the Legislative Council, Service Committee and Administration Committee.

On November 8, 2022, Jake Chapman was defeated in the General Election, defeated by State Senator Sarah Trone Garriott.

Electoral history

References

External links
 

1984 births
21st-century American politicians
American chief operating officers
Republican Party Iowa state senators
Latter Day Saints from Iowa
Living people
People from Adel, Iowa
Presidents of the Iowa Senate